Phyllidia multituberculata is a species of sea slug, a dorid nudibranch, a shell-less marine gastropod mollusk in the family Phyllidiidae.

Distribution 
This species was described from Pulu Bambu in the Aru Islands, south-west of Papua New Guinea. It has been reported from  the Indian Ocean.

Description
This species has previously been confused with Phyllidia ocellata. This species is bilaterally symmetric and reproduces sexually.

Diet
This species feeds on a sponge.

References

Phyllidiidae
Gastropods described in 1918